Class 03 may refer to:

British Rail Class 03, a class of post-war, British diesel-mechanical shunter,
DRG Class 03, a class of inter-war, German standard steam locomotive (Einheitslokomotive) for express train duties on lighter main lines.
DRG Class 03.10, a streamlined, 3-cylinder development of the above DRG Class 03 built at the outset of World War II.